André Zoltan (born 2 January 1945) is a Belgian former sports shooter. He competed in the 50 metre pistol event at the 1972 Summer Olympics.

References

External links
 

1945 births
Living people
Belgian male sport shooters
Olympic shooters of Belgium
Shooters at the 1972 Summer Olympics
People from Uccle
Sportspeople from Brussels